Sir Thomas Neville Abdy, 1st Baronet, DL JP (21 December 1810 – 20 July 1877) was a British baronet and politician.

Background
He was the only son of Captain Anthony Abdy, a maternal greatgrandson of Sir William Abdy, 4th Baronet, and his wife Grace Rich, daughter of Sir Thomas Rich, 5th Baronet. Abdy was educated at Winchester Cathedral in Hampshire and at St John's College, Cambridge, where he graduated with a Bachelor of Arts in 1833. He was then admitted to the Middle Temple.

Career
In 1841, Abdy contested Maldon unsuccessfully. He was elected as a Member of Parliament (MP) for Lyme Regis in 1847 and represented the constituency until 1852. On 22 December 1849, Abdy was created a baronet, of Albyns, in the County of Essex, and in 1875, he was appointed High Sheriff of Essex. Abdy was Deputy Lieutenant and Justice of Peace.

Family
On 19 October 1841, he married Harriet Alston, second daughter of Rowland Alston. They had five children, a daughter and four sons:

 Mary Harriet (1842–1853)
 William Neville (1844–1910)
 Grace Emma (1846–1923)
 Anthony (b. 1849)
 Robert Jack (1850–1893)

Abdy died aged 66 and was succeeded in the baronetcy successively by his sons William, Anthony and Henry. His daughter Grace Abdy married Lord Albert, son of the 2nd Duke of Sutherland.

References

External links

1810 births
1877 deaths
Alumni of St John's College, Cambridge
Baronets in the Baronetage of the United Kingdom
Deputy Lieutenants of Essex
High Sheriffs of Essex
Members of the Middle Temple
Members of the Parliament of the United Kingdom for Lyme Regis
UK MPs 1847–1852
English cricketers
Marylebone Cricket Club cricketers
People educated at Winchester College
English cricketers of 1826 to 1863